Catherine Liu (born 1964) is an American cultural theorist and author whose areas of research include Sinophone cinema, French literature, critical theory, identity politics, and visual arts. She is known for her critique of the professional–managerial class.

Education and career 
Liu earned a B.A. from Yale University and a Ph.D. from CUNY Graduate Center. She previously taught at the University of Minnesota, Twin Cities and Bard College before accepting a position at the University of California, Irvine. Liu is professor in the Departments of Film and Media Studies/Visual Studies, Comparative Literature and English at the University of California, Irvine, where she also served as director of the UCI Humanities Center. As President of the Western Humanities Alliance, she edited a special issue of the Western Humanities Review (2016) on the topic of prestige. For several years she organized a project about urban history and planned communities.

Research 
Her research and teaching focuses on the intellectual history and formation of cultural criticism, the history of the professional-managerial class, psychoanalytic theory, the political economy of cultural revolutions, and the work of the Frankfurt School and Walter Benjamin. She has also published on various topics in art criticism, museum history, and cultural politics.

In 2000, she published Copying Machines: Taking Notes for the Automaton with the University of Minnesota Press. In 2011, she published The American Idyll: Academic Anti-Elitism as Cultural Critique with the University of Iowa Press which addresses the abuse of populist mistrust of elites and its relationship to anti-intellectualism in American cultural politics. Her most recent book published in 2021, Virtue Hoarders: The Case Against the Professional Managerial Class, is a polemical call to reject making a virtue out of taste and consumption habits. She argues that the class stands in the way of social justice and economic redistribution by promoting meritocracy, philanthropy, and other self-serving operations as an individualist path to a better world. She is also co-editor of the 2007 book, The Dreams of Interpretation: A Century down the Royal Road, a reexamination of the legacy of Freud.

Selected publications

References

External links 

Living people
Yale University alumni
City University of New York alumni
University of California, Irvine faculty
21st-century American women writers
1964 births